Daniel Anthony James (born August 10, 1937  – July 4, 1987) was a professional American football offensive lineman for the Pittsburgh Steelers from 1960 to 1966. He played college football at Ohio State University.

Dan attended Elder High School and the Center was drafted with the eight pick in the first round of the 1959 NFL Draft by the San Francisco 49ers.

He eventually played with the Pittsburgh Steelers and retired in the late 1960s. He then returned home to Cincinnati with his wife and children.

References

External links

1937 births
1987 deaths
Players of American football from Cincinnati
American football offensive linemen
Ohio State Buckeyes football players
Pittsburgh Steelers players
Chicago Bears players
Place of death missing
Elder High School alumni